Acalolepta corpulenta is a species of beetle in the family Cerambycidae. It was described by Stephan von Breuning in 1935. It is known from New Britain and the Solomon Islands.

References

Acalolepta
Beetles described in 1935